Chefchaouen, also known as Chaouen, is a city in northwest Morocco. It is the chief town of the province of the same name and is noted for its buildings in shades of blue, for which it is nicknamed the "Blue City". Chefchaouen is situated just inland from Tangier and Tétouan.

It was founded as a military outpost shortly before the Spanish Reconquista of Granada, and its population grew quickly with Muslim and Jewish immigrants fleeing from Spain. The economy is based on a traditional agro-pastoral system with olive and fig plantations; numerous water mills for grinding grain and olives; a handicrafts sector focusing on leather, iron, textiles, and carpentry; and summer-dominated tourism.

Etymology 
The name "Chefchaouen" is of Tarifit or Tamazigh origin, derived from the word isakon or echaouen which means 'the horns', and the word chef which means 'look at'. Chefchaouen thus means 'look at the horns', reflecting the two mountain peaks overlooking the area. Nowadays, Chefchaouen is known as "the Blue Pearl" of Morocco, known for its traditional houses painted in blue and white.

The city is also called "Chaouen" by the inhabitants of the northern region.

History 

The city was founded in 1471 as a small kasbah by Ali ibn Rashid al-Alami, a descendant of Abd al-Salam ibn Mashish al-Alami and Idris I. Al-Alami built the kasbah to defend against Portuguese invasions of northern Morocco. Along with the Ghomaras of the region, many Moriscos and Spanish and Portuguese Jews settled here during and after the Reconquista of Spain.

Ali Ben Rashid was born in Gherzoim, a nearby village,  (844 AH). He went to Emirate of Granada in 1460 and achieved outstanding services in battle against the Crusaders. He settled in Chefchaouen  and, due to his experience as a warrior, was chosen as successor to his cousin ibn Abi Jum'ah and leader of the Mujahideen in the northwest of Morocco. He fought alongside the Amir of Tétouan, Ali al-Mandri, who married his daughter, the Mujahida Aisha al-Hurra. The latter, known by her title, Sayyida al-Hurra, reigned Chefchaouen through a rapid period of growth and development.

Chefchaouen was home to Andalusian families between 1492 and 1609, when the last Moriscos were expelled from Andalusia by King Felipe III. These Andalusian families built their own residential quarters surrounded by walls, in the Andalusian architectural style, very similar to the Arab quarters of Granada.

Pressures of the Reconquista and the fall of Granada led many of its people to immigrate to Morocco, which continued for more than three centuries. Some of them chose the large cities of Fes, Marrakesh, Tlemcen, Tunis, and Kairouan, while others settled in the jihadist fortress of Chefchaouen, which was in a fierce war against Portuguese armies. They established their quarters on the rugged slopes of the Chefchaouen Mountains. In a few decades, the fortress of Chefchaouen turned into a prosperous new city, in which the Andalusi-Granadan culture merged with the culture of Ghomara. The urban expansion included military fortifications such as walls and about ten gates and the construction of several mosques including the Grand Mosque. The Andalusian community that settled in the city also included several well-known poets and philosophers.

In October 1920, General Dámaso Berenguer occupied the city for the Spanish protectorate in Morocco. Following the Spanish , Chaouen was part of the Republic of the Rif led by Abd el-Krim from 1924 to 1926. In September 1925, in the middle of the Rif War, a rogue squadron of American volunteer pilots, the Lafayette Escadrille, bombarded civilians in Chaouen. Colonel Charles Sweeny had proposed the idea to French Prime Minister Paul Painlevé, who "warmly welcomed the Colonel's request."

After el-Krim was defeated with the help of the French, he was deported to Réunion. The Spanish Army retook the city in 1926.

Geography

Location 
It is bordered by five provinces – Tétouan Province to the northwest, Larache Province to the west, Al Hoceïma Province to the east, Taounate Province to the south, Ouezzane Province to the southwest – and the Mediterranean Sea to the northeast. The Province of Chefchaouen belongs to the Tanger-Tetouan-Al Hoceima Region and consists of one urban commune (the municipality of Chefchaouen) and 27 rural communes, giving the province a rural character.

Climate 
The province of Chefchaouen has a Mediterranean climate characterized by rainy and cool winters from October to April, and dry and hot summers from May to September. (Rainfall could reach 1,400–2,000 mm per year, with snowfall over the mountain peaks.)

Environment

Mountains 

In addition to its mountainous aspect, the province also has important sites on the Moroccan Mediterranean coast, such as El Jebha, Kaa-Asras, Chmaala, and Steha.

Chefchaouen and its surroundings were historically and geographically known as the Jbala region or country (i.e. mountain inhabitants) where many Jbala tribes once lived. The Jbala region was officially described at the beginning of the 20th century as a geographical territory corresponding to the foothills of the southwestern Rif, between the massifs of the central Rif and the pre-Rif domain.

Forests 
Forest formations are distributed according to local variations of climate and soil due to altitude, lithology, and human activity. There are sclerophyllous oaks such as cork oak (Quercus suber), holm oak (Quercus rotundifolia), and kermes oak (Quercus coccifera), deciduous oaks such as Tauzin oak (Quercus pyrenaica) and zeen oak (Quercus canariensis and Quercus faginea), and natural coniferous forests such as Maghreb maritime pine (Pinus pinaster var. maghrebiana), Moroccan fir (Abies maroccana) and Atlas cedar (Cedrus atlantica).

The province of Chefchaouen is considered one of the richest regions in terms of biological diversity. It is designated as a Mediterranean biodiversity hotspot (i.e. a zone with an exceptional concentration of endemic and threatened species) and suffers from accelerated forest degradation due to anthropogenic pressures exacerbated by the impact of climate change. Two protected areas have been created in the province:

The park extends over the eastern part of the limestone ridge of the central-western Rif, with cliffs and gorges making accessibility very limited. The park aims to protect the endemic Moroccan fir forest, and species such as Atlas cedar, black pine (Pinus nigra subsp. mauretanica), and Maghreb maritime pine. In terms of fauna, there are 37 mammal species including the threatened Barbary macaque (Macaca sylvanus), the otter (Lutra lutra), more than 117 birds including some rare or very rare raptors, and around thirty species of reptiles and amphibians.

It was created to preserve natural forests and restore related natural resources and services.

In 2006, these two parks were included in the Mediterranean Intercontinental Biosphere Reserve of Spain and Morocco, established in the context of UNESCO's Man and the Biosphere (MAN) program. Reforestation programs have been carried out since 1966, and by 2016 had generated .

Water resources 

High rainfall at altitude provides a potential for hydrological development. Several seasonal rivers flow into the Mediterranean or feed the Loukos or Ouargha rivers.

Demographics 
According to the last census of the Moroccan population (2014), the municipality of Chefchaouen has a population of 42,786. Chefchaouen Province has more than 457,432 inhabitants representing 1.3% of Moroccan total population. The provincial population is 87.45% rural.

Culture 

Chefchaouen has maintained strong relations with the inhabitants of the Jbala Region such as Akhmas, Ghomara, Ghazaoua, and Sanhaja tribes, particularly in terms of trade. The federations of these tribes were sometimes a source of strength, and sometimes a weakness due to their frequent struggles to take possession of assets such as water sources, grazing areas, and fertile land.

The traditional houses of Chefchaouen were made of stone, brick, tile, wood, soil, and lime. Each house had an open yard in the center surrounded by corridors and bedrooms. The yards are often decorated with fruit trees such as oranges, lemons, berries, and grapes, as well as some perfumed shrubs including night-blooming jessamine (Cestrum nocturnum) and jasmine (Jasminum officinale). From a physiognomy perspective, the city is influenced by Andalusian architecture, such as the curved brick archways that strengthen the houses and decorate the narrow blue alleyways, the traditional water network, and the landscaping and care of plants inside houses and mosques. From a cultural perspective, many Chefchaouen families have conserved the art of Andalusian music, which has become the main ritual of Chefchaouen religious festivals and social ceremonies.

The rural landscape was characterized by a distribution of space according to intra- and intertribal relations. At the level of each dshar (low-density rural settlements), the houses are built around a mosque or a marabou and occupy the center of the concentric spatial structure of traditional agro-sylvo-pastoral systems. This spatial distribution of dshars is tightly associated with arable land and availability of water resources, with shifting cultivation limited to a diffuse strip of matorral shrubland and pasture that mark the transition to forests. However, this traditional agro-salvo-pastoral system has been deeply affected by multiple processes of modern socio-cultural and economic transformation.

Traditions 
Chefchaouen's residents commit to religious and social rituals. The devout perform prayer together in the mosque or the zaouia (i.e. agglomeration of marabous). They also like to visit their families and friends on religious and social occasions. Some of the major religious and social occasions include:

Sha’banah takes place on the 15th of Shaa’ban (i.e. the 8th month of Hijri calendar). It is commonly known as the Day of Nusskhah, in which the tomb of Moulay Abd Salam Ben Mshish is visited, of particular observance by the students of msids (Quran schools).
The night of Al-Qad is observed on the 26th of Ramadan, when the people encourage 7–10-year-old girls to fast. Families usually celebrate at home, but often parade following the afternoon prayer with the girls wearing wedding clothes.
Ashura is celebrated on the 10th of Muharram (observed by Jewish residents as Yom Kippur). Preparations begin after Eid Al-Adha when part of the Eid meat is dried as qaddid, and on Ashura is eaten with couscous by families, along with dried fruit (almonds, walnuts, raisins, and pistachios), dates and various traditional sweets. Children receive great attention and are often gifted traditional and modern items, including toys.
Mawlid Nabaoui (Muhammad's birthday) is celebrated on the 12th of Rabii’ Al-Awwal. It is designated as Eid and involves the reading of the Quran and Muhammad's biography in mosques or at people’s homes. This night is also celebrated in the mausoleum of Ali Ben Rashid and the 13 zaouias throughout the city. Couscous is served to the poor and prisoners. During this celebration, mass circumcision of children is carried out following the afternoon prayer, and gifts are distributed to their families.
Hakouzah Day is celebrated on 1 January of the agricultural solar calendar. It is observed by preparing and eating various traditional foods, in appreciation of the past harvest's bounty and the hope that the New Year will be better. Some researchers believe that the word Hakouzah is a distortion from the Moroccan dialect Agouza (meaning 'old women') and that it refers to the night of the old calendar.

Despite the diversity of these ceremonies, observances of similar characters are present in almost all of Morocco.

Economic activities

Agriculture and sea fishing 

Despite the significant rainfall, agricultural activity is limited due to the rugged and steep topography, the scarcity of arable land, the low mechanization level, and the lack of irrigation infrastructure. These factors have contributed to the emergence of traditional agriculture largely dependent on climatic hazards. Forests have been harvested for wood and pulp products and to clear land for agriculture. Villagers from rural areas form an important workforce in the agricultural field.

The province is dominated by cereal agriculture, goat herding in the mountains, and arboriculture of fig and almond trees. The countryside has a reputation as a prolific source of kief. The Chefchaouen region is one of the main producers of cannabis in Morocco.

Beans and broad beans are the most widely cultivated and occupy more than three-quarters of the area devoted to this type of crop;
The olive tree is the most widespread with 83% of the area, representing 66% of the total production.
Animal husbandry: Production of red meat is estimated at about 1,037.4 tons in 2016, of which 70% is beef, the rest mutton, and goat.
Maritime fishing: The province's  of the Mediterranean coast recorded landings of 2,166 tons of fish in 2016, valued at 14.3 million Moroccan dirhams. 94.4% of landings were bluefish.

This traditional agro-pastoral system – of olive and fig plantations, cereal fields, and limited grazing pastures – has been carried out for centuries. Local products are also diversified, such as fresh goat cheese and other animal products, medicinal and aromatic plants, and products based on wild olives, figs, wool, etc. These various agricultural models have contributed to a richness of food diversity and, in 2010, UNESCO recognized Chefchaouen for its Mediterranean diet.

In 2020, Chefchaouen was included as a learning city in the UNESCO Global Network of Learning Cities (GNLC). This network encourages policy discussion and mutual learning between its members, to forge collaborations and develop abilities and designs tools to support and identify progress.

Industry and commerce 
The industrial sector remains very weak despite the province's potential with its availability of human and natural resources. The commercial sector is one of the main economic supports of Chefchaouen, bolstered by tourism activity and remittances from workers abroad. It is mainly focused on urban centers and the main rural communes and is based on the sale of traditional food products, construction materials, clothing, and household items. Commercial transactions become dynamic during summer, with the influx of tourists and the return of foreign workers to the province.

Tourism 

During the holidays, the city sees a considerable influx of Moroccan and foreign tourists, attracted by its natural landscapes and historical monuments. Tourism is largely seasonal, with 200 hotels in the province catering to an influx of European tourists in the summer. The city history is seen in the brightly painted medina (old town) with its blue-white facades, the narrow streets of the Bab Souk district, and the interior gardens of the Kasbah and its ramparts and towers, while the city is surrounded by diversified landscapes including mountains, forests, and beaches. A nearby attraction is the Kef Toghobeit Cave, one of the deepest caves in Africa. Chefchaouen also draws tourists from its reputation as a center of the marijuana plantation region in north Morocco.

In terms of accommodation, Chefchaouen encompasses in 2016, 68 hotels, including 17 classified hotels, with a capacity of 1,796 beds, including 720 beds for classified hotels. Moroccans represent 49% of tourists, followed by Russians at 10.9%, Japanese at 9.2%, and Spanish at 7.8%.

Handicraft sector 

The handicraft sector or traditional industry (e.g., sewing, cupping, blacksmithing, carpentry, needlework, and tanning) is the most common economic activity practiced by Chefchaouen's population and thus plays key a socio-economic role in this province. It is closely related to the tourism sector and includes a multitude of artisans (38 cooperatives and 688 artisan adherents in 2016) largely occupied in leather, textile, ironwork, and traditional carpentry. Wood products represent the best-selling artisanal product in the province, with 57.6% of products sold.

Villagers from neighboring regions of Chefchaouen practice crafts and various trades such as knitting, tanning, construction, and weaving.

Landmarks 

Chefchaouen's blue walls are a popular subject of interest. There are several theories as to why the walls were painted blue. One popular theory is that the blue keeps mosquitos away. The blue is said to symbolize the sky and heaven and serve as a reminder to lead a spiritual life. However, according to some locals, the walls were mandated to be painted blue in the 1970s to attract tourists.

Medina 

The medina is one of the most important historical neighborhoods, where blue and white paint dominates the walls and houses, and the streets are so narrow that cars cannot pass, which provides a peaceful and calm atmosphere.

The kasbah is one of the first buildings constructed in the city in the Andalusian style. It includes the emir's residence, a small mosque for the emir, a prison, a garden, a horse stable, sheds for the animals, and dozens of towers. The kasbah played a major role as a house of Makhzen (i.e. authoritarian forces) until its occupation by the Spanish in 1920. The kasbah was built from strong and sustainable local raw materials such as limestone, with successive layers of hard rammed earth. Fired red bricks were used to build the sides of the doors and arches. Local cedar, fir, juniper, and other woods were used to form the roofs, clad in red tiles. The Kasbah overlooks the Outae Hammam yard.
Its name is derived from outae which means "low ground or yard" and hammam due to the presence of the first hammam (traditional public bath) in the center of the town. Its design is similar to the Andalusian public yards of Granada or Cordoba. While historically a crossroad, its function changed to a tourist center surrounded by cafes and restaurants.

Souiqah quarter is the second-oldest residential agglomeration in the city and includes the houses of old Andalusian families and a large number of shops and stalls that sell local products.

The traditional souk (bazaar, marketplace) has small shops and stalls selling traditional handiwork such as colorful porcelain utensils, textiles and clothing, leatherware, and various souvenirs. The weekly market was a place for strengthening social ties between the townspeople and their rural environment.

Al-Kharazin district was settled by many villagers from neighboring tribes, giving it a rural character.

Religious sites 

The Grand Mosque of Chefchaouen is the city's oldest and historically most important mosque, located at Place Outae Hammam at the heart of the medina, close to the kasbah. The Spanish Mosque is a disused mosque overlooking the town from a hill to the east. It was built by the Spanish in the 1920s and is now a popular lookout point. The Mausoleum of Abdessalam Ben Mshish al-Alami is dedicated to the patron saint of northern Morocco's Jebalah region, Moulay Abdessalam Ben Mshish al-Alami.

Natural areas 

Ras Al-Maa (mountainous spring of water) is the main water resource for the population. From the Ras Al-Maa, rivulets branch out and provision mosques, houses, zaouias, hammams, fountains, hotels, farms, and gardens. A large number of water mills for grinding grain and olives are distributed near these rivulets. Women traditionally gather along the banks of the river to socialize as they wash clothes and blankets. The river is frequently visited by tourists.

The Chefchaouen Mountains belong to the Rif mountain range and are the destination of guided excursions. They are characterized by a rich flora, especially the forests of cork oak, green oak, endemic Moroccan fir, and Atlas cedar.

International relations
A list of twin towns and sister cities includes:
  Issaquah, Washington, United States (since April 11, 2007)
  Vejer de la Frontera, Spain
  Ronda, Spain
  Kunming, China
  Testour, Tunisia
 Mértola, Portugal
  Beni Mellal, Morocco (domestic)

Notable people
Ahmed Hammoudan, professional footballer
 Abdelkarim Tabbal, poet

References and notes

External links 

 
Populated places in Chefchaouen Province
Municipalities of Morocco
1471 establishments
Populated places established in the 1470s
Provincial capitals in Morocco
15th-century establishments in Morocco